Occupational Health and Safety Act may refer to:
Occupational Health and Safety Act, 1993, South Africa
Occupational Health and Safety Act 2000, New South Wales (repealed)

See also
 Occupational Safety and Health Act (United States), 1970
 Occupational Safety and Health Act 1994, Malaysia